Marat Natfulovich Kalimulin (20 August 1988 – 7 September 2011) was a Russian professional ice hockey defenceman who played for Lokomotiv Yaroslavl of the Kontinental Hockey League (KHL). He was killed in the 2011 Lokomotiv Yaroslavl plane crash, in which almost all players and coaches from the club perished.

Death
On 7 September 2011, Kalimulin was killed when a Yakovlev Yak-42 passenger aircraft, carrying nearly his entire Lokomotiv team, crashed just outside Yaroslavl, Russia. The team was traveling to Minsk to play their opening game of the season, with its coaching staff and prospects. Lokomotiv officials said "'everyone from the main roster was on the plane plus four players from the youth team.'"

See also
List of ice hockey players who died during their playing career

References

External links

1988 births
2011 deaths
Lokomotiv Yaroslavl players
Sportspeople from Tolyatti
Russian ice hockey defencemen
Tatar people of Russia
Victims of the Lokomotiv Yaroslavl plane crash